Mesgaran (also Romanized as Mesgarān) is a village in Tus Rural District, in the Central District of Mashhad County, Razavi Khorasan Province, Iran. At the 2006 census, its population was 26, in 6 families.

References 

Populated places in Mashhad County